Tomás de Aguiar (died c. 1679) was a Spanish painter, active during the Baroque period. He was a pupil of Diego Velázquez, and known for painting portraits.

With little information about his life, the most accurate news is that provided by the 17th-century historian Lazaro Diaz del Valle, and a friend of Velasquez, which included Aguiar in his handwritten notes in the section dedicated to the "Spanish Lords and Noble Knights have been entertaining to paint and draw," where it said :

Juan Agustín Ceán Bermúdez, who without indicating his source was a pupil of Velazquez, also praised Aguiar's skill in portraits, and noted that he painted "with great credit" for the 1660s. The poet Gabriel Bocángel wrote in 1653 "D. Thomas de Aguiar, who in the elegance of his numbers deserved testifies to the opinion of his own", which would confirm the origin of Aguiar as a gentleman with good education.

The existence of some kind of relationship with Velasquez is further confirmed by the inventory of goods left at his death and his wife Juana Pacheco, inventory conducted by Juan Bautista Martínez del Mazo in August 1660, where an item designated as number 166 was collected, presumably a portrait painted by Velázquez and now lost, described as "another cabeça (head) of Don Tomás de Aguiar".

Playwright and historian Antonio de Solís y Ribadeneyra, wrote "Don Tomás de Aguiar, a distinguished painter, and great Courtier", and dedicated a sonnet dedicated to him in response to Aguiar's painting a portrait of him:

Aguiar died in Madrid, Spain in 1679.

Notes

References

 Ceán Bermúdez, Juan Agustín, Diccionario histórico de los más ilustras profesores de la Bellas Artes en España, Madrid, 1800.
 Corpus velazqueño (2000). Corpus velazqueño. Documentos y textos, 2 vols., bajo la dirección de J. M. Pita Andrade.. Madrid, Ministerio de Educación, Cultura y Deporte. .
 Doval Trueba, María del Mar (2003). Los “velazqueños”. Pintores que trabajaron en el taller de Velázquez. Madrid, Universidad Complutense, tesis doctoral.
 Pérez Sánchez, Alfonso E. (1992). Pintura barroca en España 1600–1750. Madrid : Ediciones Cátedra, pág. 240. .

17th-century Spanish painters
Spanish male painters
Spanish Baroque painters
1679 deaths
Year of birth unknown